Eleanor Lambert (died 1994) was a South African cricketer who played as a wicket-keeper. She appeared in two Test matches for South Africa in 1960 and 1961, both against England. Opening the batting, she scored 12 runs in the first innings of the first Test, and scored 34 in the second innings as South Africa drew the match. Opening again in the second Test, she could only manage 2 runs in the first-innings, and with South Africa following on, 17 runs in the second. She did not appear in the last two Tests of the series, and was not to play for South Africa again. She played domestic cricket for Natal.

References

External links
 
 

1994 deaths
Date of birth missing
Year of birth missing
Place of birth missing
South African women cricketers
South Africa women Test cricketers
KwaZulu-Natal Coastal women cricketers
Wicket-keepers
20th-century South African women